Czarnowron is a Polish coat of arms. It was used by several szlachta families.

History

Blazon

Notable bearers

Notable bearers of this coat of arms include:

See also
 Polish heraldry
 Heraldic family
 List of Polish nobility coats of arms 
 Ślepowron coat of arms

Sources 
 Dynastic Genealogy 
 Ornatowski.com 

Polish coats of arms